SS Alexander Lillington (MC contract 869) was a Liberty ship built in the United States during World War II. She was named after Alexander Lillington, a North Carolina Patriot militia officer who served at the Battle of Moore's Creek Bridge and the Battle of Camden.

The ship was laid down by North Carolina Shipbuilding Company in their Cape Fear River yard on November 2, 1942, and launched on December 6, 1942. Lillington was chartered to the South Atlantic Steamship Company for the War Shipping Administration until January 1947. She was operated by Waterman Steamship Corporation until December 1947.  From then until January 1948 when Lillington was placed in the Wilmington Fleet of the National Defense Reserve Fleet she was chartered to Boland & Cornelius.  The vessel was scrapped in 1961.

References 

Liberty ships
Ships built in Wilmington, North Carolina
1942 ships